Rip is a masculine given name which may refer to:

 Rip Esselstyn (born 1963), American health activist, food writer, triathlete and former firefighter
 Jeong Rip (1574–1629), a scholar-official of the Korean Joseon Dynasty
 Rip Rense (born 1954), American music and film journalist, author, poet and music producer
 Rip Reukema (1857-1917), American politician
 Rip Van Dam (c. 1660–1749), acting governor of the Province of New York from 1731 to 1732
 Shin Rip (1546–1592), Korean general

Fictional characters 
Rip Wheeler, a character in the Paramount Network series Yellowstone.

See also
Rip (nickname)

Masculine given names